Wrestling competitions at the 2021 Southeast Asian Games took place at Gia Lâm District Sporting Hall in Hanoi, Vietnam from 17 to 19 May 2022.

Medal table

Medalists

Men's Greco-Roman

Men's freestyle

Women's freestyle

References

Wrestling
2021